"That's How You Write a Song" is a song written and performed by Belarusian-Norwegian singer Alexander Rybak. It represented Norway in the Eurovision Song Contest 2018 in Lisbon, Portugal. The song was released as a digital download on 15 January 2018.

Eurovision Song Contest

Melodi Grand Prix 2018 was the 56th edition of the Norwegian national final Melodi Grand Prix and it selected Norway's entry for the Eurovision Song Contest 2018. Ten songs were chosen to participate, and the selected singers, entries and composers were revealed on 15 January 2018. The ten songs competed during the final at the Oslo Spektrum on 10 March 2018, hosted by Kåre Magnus Bergh and Silya Nymoen. The four acts who received the most votes from the Norwegian public progressed to the silver final. In the silver final, the two acts who received the most votes from the public progressed to the gold duel. In the gold duel the act who received the most votes from the public was declared the winner. Alexander Rybak won with the song "That's How You Write a Song", receiving 71% of the vote in the Gold Duel. The song competed in the second semi-final of the Eurovision Song Contest 2018, held on 10 May 2018 in Lisbon, Portugal.

Track listing

Charts

Certifications

Release history

References

Eurovision songs of Norway
Eurovision songs of 2018
2018 songs
2018 singles
English-language Norwegian songs
Alexander Rybak songs
Songs written by Alexander Rybak
Melodi Grand Prix songs